Crediton Hamlets is a civil parish in Mid Devon in the English county of Devon.  It has a population of 1,307.

References

Civil parishes in Devon